Alopecosa kochi is a species of wolf spider in the family Lycosidae. It is found in North America (Arizona).

References

External links

 

kochi
Articles created by Qbugbot
Spiders described in 1877